Walton Place is a historic 1907 building at 75 Marietta Street in downtown Atlanta, Georgia. It was originally the Georgia Railway and Power Building. The architect was John Robert Dillon.
Restoration took place in 1988.

References

 Central Atlanta Progress
 AIA Guide to the Architecture of Atlanta

John Robert Dillon buildings
Buildings and structures in Atlanta
Buildings and structures completed in 1907